William Berry may refer to:

 William Berry (Roundhead) (c. 1605–1669), fought for Parliament during the English Civil War, member of the First Protectorate Parliament
 William Berry (pioneer) (1619–1654), first settler of Hampton, New Hampshire
 William Berry, 1st Viscount Camrose (1879–1954), British newspaper publisher
 William Berry (genealogist) (1774–1851), English genealogist
 William D. Berry (artist) (1926–1979), Alaskan artist
 William D. Berry (political scientist), professor at Florida State University
 William H. Berry (1852–1928), treasurer of Pennsylvania
 William Berry (Maine settler) (1753–1824), American Revolutionary War soldier and Baptist deacon in Buckfield, Maine
 William Berry (naval architect) (1865–1937), British naval architect
 William Berry (footballer, born 1867) (1867–1919), Scottish footballer
 William Berry (footballer, born 1934), English footballer
 William Berry (journalist) (1835–1903), New Zealand journalist and newspaper editor
 William Berry (cricketer) (1897–1949), English cricketer
 William A. Berry (judge) (1915–2004), justice of the Oklahoma Supreme Court
 William Berry (artist) (1933–2010), pencil still life and human figure illustrator and professor of art at the University of Missouri
 William Jan Berry (1941–2004), American singer, musician, songwriter, and record producer; member of the duo Jan and Dean

See also
 John Berry (speedway promoter) (William John Berry, 1944–2012)
 William Bury (disambiguation)
 Bill Berry (disambiguation)